Paul E. Vallely (born November 29, 1939) is a retired U.S. Army major general and senior military analyst for Fox News. He served in the Vietnam War and retired in 1993 as deputy commanding general, Pacific Command. In 2004, together with retired Air Force lieutenant general Thomas McInerney, Vallely co-authored the book Endgame: The Blueprint for Victory in the War on Terror.  Vallely currently serves as the military committee chairman for the Center for Security Policy.

Family
He was born in DuBois, Pennsylvania, on November 29, 1939. He is married to Marian Vallely (married in September 1971). Their son, Private First Class Scott Paul Vallely, died on April 20, 2004 while in his fourth week of Special Forces Qualification Course Special Forces training.

Education
He graduated from West Point and was commissioned into the U.S. Army in 1961. He graduated from Infantry School, Ranger and Airborne Schools, Jumpmaster School, the Command and General Staff School, The Industrial College of the Armed Forces and the Army War College. His combat service in South Vietnam included positions as infantry company commander, intelligence officer, operations officer, military adviser and aide-de-camp. He retired, in 1993, from his position as deputy commanding general, Pacific, at the rank of major general.

Center for Security Policy
Vallely serves as the military committee chairman for the Center for Security Policy in Washington, D.C., and occasionally writes columns and lectures on the War on Terror. Some of his public statements have caused controversy, such as claiming that the war on terror is a war between Islam and Judeo–Christianity. 

He has been regarded as part of the counter-jihad scene.

Veteran Defenders of America
General Vallely has recently lent his support to an organization called Veteran Defenders of America. In his letter of support he stated that "[p]erhaps the greatest threat to our safety and liberty is the threat of radical Islam. This threat goes well beyond the threat of terrorism. Islamists, both inside and outside of America, are looking for any and every way to infiltrate and subvert our country through what is known as "stealth jihad." He encourages U.S. civilians (veterans) to be "eyes and ears of freedom, because we know freedom isn't free."

Jerusalem Summit organization
Vallely is also a supporter of the Jerusalem Summit organization  and an advocate of the organization's proposal  to "relocate"/"resettle" Palestine and the Palestinian people to surrounding Arab countries as a solution to the Israeli–Palestinian conflict, and to bring about the Israel's divinely-inspired rebirth.

Stand Up America US
In 2005 Vallely founded a conservative political organization called Stand Up America US that promotes the following issues: "First amendment rights, Second amendment rights, strong national defense, and secure borders, national sovereignty, support of the armed forces, individual liberties and personal responsibility, fiscally responsible, limited government." The organization endorses the views of Glenn Beck, and publishes fiction and nonfiction books to promote its message.

Works
Together with Lt. Gen. Thomas McInerney, Vallely co-authored a book published in 2004, titled Endgame: The Blueprint for Victory in the War on Terror.

Vallely also co-authored a 1980 paper with then PSYOP analyst Michael Aquino, founder of the satanist Temple of Set, titled From PSYOP to MindWar: The Psychology of Victory. MindWar is defined as "the deliberate aggressive convincing of all participants in a war that we will win that war." The paper contrasts a use of psychological operations such as propaganda with a new approach. The paper contains this passage:

In practice, however, the difference between MindWar and cynical or deceptive propaganda, from the perspective of the audience, is difficult if not impossible to perceive.

Support of Lt. Col. Lakin birther claims
In 2010 Vallely was one of three retired general officers who expressed support for U.S. Army Lt. Col. Terrance Lee Lakin in his refusal to deploy to Afghanistan based on Lakin's claim that President Barack Obama had no legitimacy as commander in chief. In an interview, Vallely stated, "I think many in the military—and many out of the military—question the natural-birth status of Barack Obama." Following Vallely's announcement, Army Maj. Gen. (retired) Jerry Curry and Air Force Lt. Gen. (retired) Thomas G. McInerney also expressed public support for Lakin. When Lakin refused the orders to deploy, the military initiated a court-martial under the Uniform Code of Military Justice. On September 2, 2010, the presiding judge of the court-martial ruled that Obama's status as a natural-born citizen is irrelevant in the court-martial case against Lakin, as Obama's eligibility is outside the jurisdiction of the military and falls within the jurisdiction of the United States Congress instead. Lakin was convicted on a charge of missing movement, sentenced to six months' confinement, and dismissed from the Army.

Vallely has also said that he firmly believes Obama “is a Muslim in nature”, and that a “civil uprising” was not “out of the question” to stop Obama who was facilitating the rise of “radical Islam, the caliphate, and Jihad – the slow infiltration and dismantling of our American institutions” either “willfully, or due to sheer naiveté.”

References

United States Army generals
United States Military Academy alumni
United States Army personnel of the Vietnam War
American broadcast news analysts
American conspiracy theorists
Counter-jihad activists
People associated with the Plame affair
People from DuBois, Pennsylvania
Military personnel from Pennsylvania
1939 births
Living people
United States Army War College alumni